The 1490s BC was a decade lasting from January 1, 1499 BC to December 31, 1490 BC.

Events and trends
Egypt conquers Nubia and the Levant (1504 BC–1492 BC).
 1500 BC: Coalescence of a number of cultural traits including undecorated pottery, megalithic burials, and millet-bean-rice agriculture indicate the beginning of the Mumun Pottery Period in the Korean peninsula. 
1497 BC—Cranaus, legendary King of Athens, is deposed after a reign of 10 years by his son-in-law Amphictyon of Thessaly, son of Deucalion and Pyrrha.
1493 BC—Thutmose I (Eighteenth dynasty of Egypt) died.
c. 1492 BC—Thutmose I dies (other date is 1493 BC).
1492 BC—April 3—Lunar Saros 37 begins.
1491 BC—According to James Ussher's chronology, this is when Moses led the Hebrews from Egypt. This was called the Exodus.

Significant people
 Thutmose II of Egypt, Pharaoh of the eighteenth dynasty of Egypt (c. 1493 BC – c. 1479 BC).

References